The cantons of Nantes are administrative divisions of the Loire-Atlantique department, in western France. Since the French canton reorganisation which came into effect in March 2015, the city of Nantes is subdivided into 7 cantons. Their seat is in Nantes.

Cantons

References

Cantons of Loire-Atlantique